The Legitimation League was an English advocacy organisation in the 1890s, which campaigned for the legitimation of illegitimate children and free love.

History 
The association was founded in Leeds, in 1893, by a group of individualist anarchists, who were close to Benjamin Tucker and his magazine Liberty. Founding members included John Badcock, Joseph Hiam Levy, John Greevz Fisher, Wordsworth Donisthorpe, as well as Gladys and Oswald Dawson. Prominent advocates for the organisation included the poet and socialist Edward Carpenter and the sexologist and social reformer Havelock Ellis.

In 1897, the League moved its headquarters to London, where its meetings commanded larger audiences. In the same year, the anarchist and women's rights activist Lillian Harman became President of the League. Originally, the League's main focus was the legitimacy and equality of children from non-church or state-sanctioned connections, now sexual liberation became the main goal. At this time Donisthorpe (President since 1893) and Fisher (Vice President) left the association.

The League's journal, The Adult was published from 1897 to 1899, with the subtitles "A Journal for the Advancement of Freedom in Sexual Relationships" and "A Crusade Against Sex-Enslavement". Lillian Harman wrote multiple articles for the journal. It was originally edited by League's secretary George Bedborough, whose wife Louie was treasurer, before his arrest in 1898 for selling a copy of Havelock Ellis' Studies in the Psychology of Sex Vol. 2. The League as a suspected anarchist organisation, had been under surveillance by Scotland Yard who used Bedborough's arrest as an opportunity to successfully destroy the League. After pleading guilty to the charge of obscenity, Bedborough agreed to no longer be associated with the League. Henry Seymour replaced Bedborough as editor until its last issue in March 1899.

Publications

References 

1893 establishments in the United Kingdom
Anarchist organisations in the United Kingdom
Children's rights organisations in the United Kingdom
Free love
Organizations established in 1893